Bridgette Nawina Tangaloa Edwards is a former New Zealand rugby union player. She made her only appearance for New Zealand when she featured in their first-ever match against the California Grizzlies in 1989. She also played for Ponsonby.

References 

Living people
New Zealand female rugby union players
New Zealand women's international rugby union players
Year of birth missing (living people)